Brockett v. Spokane Arcades, Inc., 472 U.S. 491 (1985), was a case in which the Supreme Court of the United States held that though portions of a law against obscenity and prostitution might be invalid, it would not be invalidated as a whole unless severing unconstitutional provisions would result in an unworkable law.

Background
The case involved a state statute that punished the publication of obscene materials. Obscene or lewd materials were defined by the law to include all materials that appeal to the prurient interest, among other things. "Prurient" was defined as material that incites lasciviousness or lust. The law was challenged as overbroad under the First Amendment because material that arouses only a "normal, healthy interest in sex" is constitutionally protected, but was banned by the law.

Opinion of the Court
The Court agreed with lower court rulings that the law was overbroad, however found that the entire statute could not be stricken. The code contained a severability provision indicating that the law should not be completely invalidated unless the one unconstitutional provision could not be stricken without making the law unworkable. The Court remanded the case to allow the lower court to decide if the objectionable provision could be stricken and the remainder of the law upheld.

See also
List of United States Supreme Court cases, volume 472

United States Supreme Court cases
1985 in United States case law
History of Spokane, Washington
United States obscenity case law
United States Supreme Court cases of the Burger Court